Gretna Football Club 2008 (commonly referred to as Gretna 2008 and colloquially as Gretna) is a football club from the town of Gretna. It was founded in 2008 after the bankruptcy and demise of Gretna, which had existed since 1946. Gretna 2008 is not a direct continuation of the old club, being under a completely different management and set-up; the club trades under the name Gretna FC 2008 Ltd to avoid confusion with the old Gretna.

In 2013, the club became founder members of the Lowland League, having previously played in the East of Scotland Football League Premier Division. The team played for most of the 2008–09 season at the Everholm Stadium in Annan. Late in the season, however, the new owners of Raydale Park allowed Gretna 2008 to move to the ground in their home town. In May 2011, the Raydale Community Partnership, of which Gretna FC 2008 is a member, negotiated the purchase of the site.

History
The original Gretna Football Club were founded in 1946, and joined the Scottish Football League in 2002. After being taken over by the late millionaire Brooks Mileson, the club had a meteoric rise, gaining promotion three years in a row to make the Scottish Premier League in 2007. However, the club could not financially support itself and following Mileson's illness and withdrawal of financial support, the club slipped into administration and then bankruptcy in the summer of 2008. The club were relegated from the SPL and then forced to resign their place in the Scottish Football League.

With Gretna heading out of business, on 2 July 2008, the Gretna Supporters' Society, a supporters' trust, founded "a new Gretna Football Club", and appointed Anton Hodge as chairman. In August 2009, the trust amended its articles of governance and Gretna FC 2008 is now managed directly by the members of the trust board, whose chairman is Craig Williamson. The new club is wholly owned by the society and its board elected by the society's members. The club appointed the University of Cumbria's football officer Stuart Rome as team manager and recruited much of the playing squad from Workington's reserve team. Technically, Gretna 2008 coexisted briefly with the old Gretna, which was not formally liquidated until 8 August 2008.

Unable to play at the old Gretna's home ground of Raydale Park, they instead moved into the Everholm Stadium in Annan. Gretna 2008 played their first match against Workington on 12 July 2008. Four days later, they were successfully accepted into the East of Scotland Football League First Division, and on 9 August 2008, won their first competitive match as a new club, beating Kelso United 3–0 away in their first match of the league season. The new owners of Raydale Park allowed Gretna 2008 to move to the ground in their home town in May 2009, and the Raydale Community Partnership, of which Gretna FC 2008 is a member, negotiated the purchase of the site in May 2011. They finished their first season as a new club in fourth place in the league. They narrowly missed promotion again in their second season, but finished their third, in 2010–11 being promoted as First Division champions.

In 2013, Gretna FC 2008 were elected founder members of the new Lowland Football League.

Colours and badge
Gretna 2008's colours are black and grey with white dashes. Gretna F.C. had used white shirts after Brooks Mileson took control of the club, but black and white hoops were the club's traditional colours.

The badge of the club is largely similar to that of Gretna, except that 2008 has been added to reflect the change of status in that year. The anvil represents the famous Blacksmith's Shop wedding site at Gretna Green, and the thistles represent the club's Scottish location.

Current squad

Seasons

† Season curtailed due to coronavirus pandemic.

Honours
 East of Scotland Football League First Division
 Winners: 2010–11
 East of Scotland City Cup: 
 Winners: 2012–13
 East of Scotland Qualifying Cup
 Winners (2): 2009–10, 2012–13
 Alex Jack Cup
 Winners: 2008–09
 Lowland League Cup
 Runners-Up (2): 2014-15, 2015–16

References

External links
 Club website
 Facebook
 Twitter

 
Association football clubs established in 2008
Football clubs in Dumfries and Galloway
2008 establishments in Scotland
Gretna, Dumfries and Galloway
East of Scotland Football League teams
Lowland Football League teams
Phoenix clubs (association football)